Van Heemskerk is a Dutch surname. Notable people with the surname include:

 Jacob van Heemskerk (1567–1607), Dutch explorer and admiral
 Johan van Heemskerk (1597–1656), Dutch poet

Surnames of Dutch origin